Platycephalus endrachtensis, or the bar-tailed flathead, bar-tail flathead, flag-tail flathead, northern sand flathead, northern-flag tailed flathead, sand flathead, western estuary flathead,  is a predatory fish in the family Platycephalidae. A popular angling species, the specific epithet endrachtensis refers to Eendrachtsland, an early Dutch name for Australia, with the suffix -ensis, meaning "place". Venomous spines are hazardous for safe handling.

Description
Platycephalus endrachtensis has a sandy pale brown to tan colouration for camouflage. It is recognised by the black spots on its tail. The species can be differentiated from the similar P. australis from the two dark horizontal bars on the caudal fin and the yellow blotch on the middle fin, and from P. westraliae by a triangular lappet above the upper iris. Unlike their relatives, they are not protandrous hermaphrodites.

Behaviour
P. endrachtensis is harmless to humans, is normally seen on the ocean floor, and if provoked, will burst from the sand quickly and settle again nearby.

Range and habitat
The species ranges in Australian waters from Hamelin Bay, Western Australia, to St Helens, Tasmania, with the type locality in Shark Bay; it spawns in the Swan River estuary from late spring to the start of autumn. It is also found in Indonesia. They can be seen drifting on sand flats.

Diet
The fish is an ambush predator, altering its skin colouring by "arranging [its] pigments within chromatophores" ( A.J. Hirst, 2014) and feeds on fish and sometimes large benthic crustaceans.

Relations to humans 
They are protected in Australian waters,  where it is illegal to keep specimens under 300mm, which males hardly reach.

The species was not generally considered to be overfished, however in 2022 it was classified as depleted in Tasmania. Concerns had been raised in 2014, leading to changes in Tasmanian size and bag limits in 2015.

References

endrachtensis
Fish of the Indian Ocean
Fish of the Pacific Ocean
Fish of Australia
Fish of Indonesia
Fish described in 1825
Taxa named by Jean René Constant Quoy
Taxa named by Joseph Paul Gaimard